Donald Eugene Canfield (born 1957) is a geochemist and Professor of Ecology at the University of Southern Denmark known for his work on the evolution of Earth's atmosphere and oceans. The Canfield ocean, a sulfidic partially oxic ocean existing during the middle of the Proterozoic eon, is named after him.

Education
Canfield was educated at Miami University and Yale University where he was awarded a PhD for research on diagenesis in marine sediments supervised by Robert Berner in 1988.

Career and research
Canfield has been the director of the Nordic Center for Earth Evolution (NordCEE) since August 2006, and works at the University of Southern Denmark.  His research investigates the geobiology of ocean chemistry. Prior to his current position he has worked at the Ames Research Center, Aarhus University, the University of Michigan, the Max Planck Institute for Marine Microbiology in Germany and the Georgia Institute of Technology.

Awards and honors
Canfield was elected a member of the National Academy of Sciences in 2007. He was awarded the European Geosciences Union's Vladimir Ivanovich Vernadsky Medal in 2010.
 In 2021, he was knighted by Queen Margrethe II into the Order of the Dannebrog.

References

1957 births
Living people
American geologists
Members of the Royal Danish Academy of Sciences and Letters
Members of the United States National Academy of Sciences
Members of the Royal Swedish Academy of Sciences